7 años is a 2016 Spanish drama film directed by Roger Gual.

Plot
Four business partners have a fiscal problem in the company they work for and decide to determine which of them will take the fall and go to prison for their financial crimes. From debates and a vote in the group, whoever is nominated will be jailed for 7 years.

Cast 
 Juana Acosta – Veronica (Vero)
 Àlex Brendemühl – Marcel 
 Paco León – Luis
 Manuel Morón – José Veiga
 Juan Pablo Raba – Carlos

References

External links 

2016 drama films
Spanish-language Netflix original films
Spanish drama films
Films scored by Federico Jusid
2010s Spanish films
2010s Spanish-language films